The second USS Terrier (SP-960) was a United States Navy patrol vessel in commission from 1917 to 1919.

Terrier was built as a private motorboat of the same name in 1917 for Paul Armstrong of Chicago, Illinois, by the Great Lakes Boat Building Corporation at Milwaukee, Wisconsin. Armstrong had her built to a design intended specifically for naval patrol work in connection with the Preparedness Movement, and turned her over to the Navy in 1917 for use as a section patrol boat during World War I. She was commissioned on 1 June 1917 as USS Terrier (SP-960), although her formal acquisition from Armstrong did not take place until 19 July 1917.

Assigned to the 9th Naval District, Terrier patrolled Lake Michigan for the rest of World War I.

Terrier was stricken from the Navy List on 10 March 1919 and returned to Armstrong the same day.

Notes

References

Department of the Navy Naval History and Heritage Command Online Library of Selected Images: Civilian Ships: Terrier (American Motor Boat, circa 1917). Served as USS Terrier (SP-960) in 1917-1919
NavSource Online: Section Patrol Craft Photo Archive Terrier (SP 960)

Patrol vessels of the United States Navy
World War I patrol vessels of the United States
Ships built in Milwaukee
1917 ships
Great Lakes ships